Thliptoceras decoloralis is a moth in the family Crambidae. It was described by Warren in 1896. It is found in India, where it has been recorded from the Khasia Hills and Naga Hills.

References

Moths described in 1896
Pyraustinae